Star Slinger (born Darren Williams) is an electronic music producer and DJ based in Manchester, UK, taking influences mainly from house and hip hop. Star Slinger first came to attention after self-releasing a beat tape in the summer of 2010 entitled "Volume 1". Shortly after, Williams picked up noteworthy press interest from Pitchfork Media, SPIN Magazine, Dazed & Confused Magazine and was interviewed by Annie Mac on BBC Radio 1. He has collaborated with James Vincent McMorrow, Dawn Richard, Kilo Kish, Juicy J, Project Pat, Tunji Ige, Lil B, Sam Sparro, Stunnaman, Reggie B & Teki Latex alongside others. He has officially remixed for Jessie Ware,  London Grammar,  Duke Dumont, Childish Gambino, Ellie Goulding, Bipolar Sunshine, Hundred Waters (for Skrillex's Owsla label) and was selected by ASAP Rocky to open all shows on his 2012 European Tour. He also co-wrote & produced Kilo Kish "Goldmine" which featured on the Sundance Film Festival Award-winning film Dear White People.

Musical career
Star Slinger curated an international club night under the name Jet Jam along with visual artists Anze Sekelj & Michaela Selmani. The night's programming puts an emphasis on eclecticism and no emphasis on BPM.  Artists to have played the party include Bondax, Shlohmo & Baths (musician). The JET JAM logo was designed by Michaela Selmani.

In November 2012, Jet Jam released its first single in the form of Star Slinger "Ladies In The Back" (Feat. Teki Latex) on 12" vinyl & digital download formats. They have signed many new artists since then and rolled out Toronto-based act Harrison's "Colors" EP in Europe in collaboration with Toronto's Last Gang Records.

Press quotes

"Best new act of the year by miles." – The Guardian

"Combines the hyper soul sampling of Kanye West or Dipset producers Heatmakerz with a bubbling psychedelia reminiscent of J Dilla's spacier moments." – Pitchfork Media

Background
Williams is from Huthwaite in Nottinghamshire and studied music technology at Leeds Metropolitan University.

Discography

Albums/EP's 
Being Kind (LP) [Self-released] (2022)
Rogue Cho Pa (EP) [Self-released] (2019)
Stranger ThAngs (W/ Stranger ThAngs & Laura Peñate) (EP) [Stranger ThAngs] (2018)
Home Is Where We Start From (LP) [Self-released] (2018)
First Love Music (LP) [4DG] (2018)
We Could Be More (EP) Owsla (2016)
Volume 2 (LP) Jet Jam (2016)
Sketchy (EP) [Free Download] (2016)
IV (EP) [Free Download] (2013)
Ladies in the Back (Feat. Teki Latex) (Remixes) Jet Jam (2012)
Teams vs. Star Slinger [Self-Titled] (EP) Mexican Summer (2011) (First 1000 copies were Ltd. Edition Clear Vinyl)
Volume 1 (LP) [Self-released] (2010)
Rogue Cho Pa (EP) [Self-released] (2011)

Singles

2010s

2020s

References

Living people
1986 births
Musicians from Manchester
People from Huthwaite
Owsla artists